USS May (SP-164) was a yacht purchased by the United States Navy during World War I. She was outfitted with two  guns and two machine guns, and was assigned to patrol the Atlantic Ocean coast and Caribbean and to protect Allied ships from German submarines. After over two years of patrol work, she ran aground off Cape Engano on the Dominican Republic and had to be abandoned.

A Scottish-built yacht
May — a  steam yacht built in 1891 by Ailsa Shipbuilding Co., Troon, Scotland — was originally brought to the United States by E.D. Morgan III as private yacht, and later was purchased by the U.S. Navy from J. R. De Lamar on 11 August 1917; and commissioned on 7 October 1917.

World War I service
Operating out of New London, Connecticut, May patrolled along the Atlantic coast and in the Caribbean during World War I, protecting vital Allied shipping from German U-boats.

Run aground and abandoned
As of March 1919, she was intended for eventual service as a flagship, but she ran aground on a reef off Cape Engano, Santo Domingo on 27 July 1919; after efforts to refloat her failed she was declared abandoned on 28 February 1920.

After unfruitful attempts to refloat her, Mays wreck was offered for sale. However, no purchasers appeared, and she was abandoned as unsalable in June 1923.

Awards and honors

Ensign Tedford H. Cann, USNRF was awarded the Medal of Honor for "courageous conduct" onboard May in November 1917. His citation reads:

References

External links
 USS May (SP-164), 1917-1919

 

World War I patrol vessels of the United States
Steam yachts
Ships built in Scotland
Shipwrecks in the Caribbean Sea
1891 ships
Maritime incidents in 1919